Kitty Linn O'Neil (March 24, 1946 – November 2, 2018) was an American stuntwoman and racer, known as "the fastest woman in the world". An illness in early childhood left her deaf, and more illnesses in early adulthood cut short a career in driving. O'Neil's career as a stuntwoman and race driver led to her depiction in a television movie and as an action figure. Her women's absolute land speed record stood until 2019.

Early life
Kitty Linn O'Neil was born in Corpus Christi, Texas on March 24, 1946. John O'Neil, her father, was an officer in the United States Army Air Forces, who had been an oil wildcatter. He died in an airplane crash during Kitty's childhood. Her mother, Patsy Compton O'Neil, was native Cherokee. At five months of age, O'Neil contracted simultaneous childhood diseases, losing her hearing. After her deafness became apparent at the age of two, her mother taught her lip-reading and speech, eventually becoming a speech therapist and co-founding a school for students with hearing impairment in Wichita Falls, Texas.

As a teenager, Kitty became a competitive 10-meter platform diver and 3-meter springboard diver, winning Amateur Athletic Union diving championships. She trained beginning in 1962 with diving coach Sammy Lee. Before the trials for the 1964 Olympics, she broke her wrist and contracted spinal meningitis, threatening her ability to walk and ending her contention for a position on the Olympic diving team. She competed in 100m backstroke and 100m freestyle swimming at the 1965 Summer Deaflympics. After recovering from meningitis, she lost interest in diving, and turned to water skiing, scuba diving, skydiving and hang gliding, stating that diving "wasn't scary enough for me". In her late 20s, she underwent two treatments for cancer.

Racing and stunt career
By 1970, O'Neil had taken up racing on water and land, participating in the Baja 500 and Mint 400. She met stuntmen Hal Needham and Ron Hambleton while racing motorcycles, and lived with Hambleton, giving up racing for a time. In the mid-1970s, she entered stunt work, training with Needham, Hambleton and Dar Robinson. In 1976, she became the first woman to perform with Stunts Unlimited, the leading stunt agency. As a stuntwoman, she appeared in The Bionic Woman, Airport '77, The Blues Brothers, Smokey and the Bandit II and other television and movie productions. In 1978, her stunt career inspired a Kitty O'Neil action figure, made by Mattel.

In filming for a 1979 episode of Wonder Woman, O'Neil was hired to perform a stunt of high difficulty for Jeannie Epper, Lynda Carter's usual stunt double. She later broke her record with a  fall from a helicopter.

Land speed record
On 6 December 1976, in southeastern Oregon's Alvord Desert, O'Neil set the land-speed record for female drivers. She piloted a $350,000 (equivalent to $ million in ) hydrogen peroxide powered three-wheeled rocket car built by Bill Fredrick called the "SMI Motivator".

O'Neil's runs reportedly used 60% of the available thrust, and O'Neil estimated that she could have exceeded  with full power.

Attempt prevented by sponsors
Restrained by her contract, O'Neil struggled with sponsors at the time. She was contracted to break only the women's land speed record, and was obligated to allow Hal Needham to set the overall record. According to her contract, she was not supposed to exceed . Needham's sponsor, toy company Marvin Glass and Associates, was preparing a Hal Needham action figure and obtained an injunction to stop further runs by O'Neil. A spokesman was reported (incorrectly according to Sports Illustrated) to say it is "unbecoming and degrading for a woman to set a land speed record." Needham did not set a record or even drive the car, and a legal effort by O'Neil and Hambleton to allow O'Neil another attempt failed. The sponsors received negative publicity for removing O'Neil from the car, and the Needham action figures were not marketed.

Later years and death
Since the run was not repeated according to NHRA rules, it is not recognized as an official drag racing record.

In 1979, O'Neil's experiences served as the basis for a biographical movie Silent Victory: The Kitty O'Neil Story, starring Stockard Channing. O'Neil commented that about half of the movie was an accurate depiction.

O'Neil stepped away from stunt and speed work in 1982 after stunt colleagues were killed while performing. She moved to Minneapolis with Michaelson, and eventually moved to Eureka, South Dakota, with Raymond Wald. When she retired, O'Neil had set 22 speed records on land and water.

She died on November 2, 2018, of pneumonia in Eureka, South Dakota, at age 72. In 2019, she received the Oscars in Memoriam award.

Further reading
 
 
 ,

Notes

References

External links
 
 
 Photo: Dressed as Wonder Woman, O'Neil leaping, February 12, 1979 - (Bettmann Archive/Getty Images)
 Photo: O’Neil leaping off the Valley Hilton in Sherman Oaks, California, as Wonder Woman in 1979 - (R.L. Oliver/Los Angeles Times Photographic Archive/UCLA Library Special Collections via The New York Times)

1946 births
2018 deaths
Female dragster drivers
Sportspeople from Corpus Christi, Texas
Racing drivers from Texas
Deaf sportspeople
American stunt performers
American female racing drivers
American deaf people
American people of Cherokee descent
People from Eureka, South Dakota
21st-century American women